Nappy Boy is an American record label founded by R&B and hip hop artist T-Pain. The label is distributed by RCA Records, and formerly by Jive Label Group. The label's roster of artists includes Gym Class Heroes front man Travie McCoy, Young Cash and Chayo Nash.

In May 2008, T-Pain announced that he would like to turn Nappy Boy Entertainment into a new business venture which would turn his company digital, by releasing albums and songs online via iTunes. The new venture, Nappy Boy Digital, focuses on albums and songs released as downloads and ringtones, with few physical releases.

Featured in the Nappy Boy logo is the Florida State Capitol representing Tallahassee, Florida, where T-Pain was born.

Artists
 T-Pain (Nappy Boy/RCA Records)
 Young Cash 
 Piao 
 Chayo Nash 
 SprngBrk (Formerly known as "A1" and "A1 Bentley") 
 NandoSTL

Former artists
 Jay Lyriq
 Sophia Fresh
 One Chance
 Shay Mooney
 Tay Dizm
 Travie McCoy (Nappy Boy/Decaydance/Atlantic)
 Shawnna
 Field Mob
 Brandon Watson
 Profit Dinero

Producers
 L.a Chase
Young Fyre
 Bishop Jones
BlackPlay

Albums released on label

Upcoming Albums
2017: T-Pain - OBLiViON
2016: Travie McCoy - Rough Waters
2016: Tay Dizm – Welcome to the New World

Singles

T-Pain
2008: T-Pain – "Can't Believe It" (feat. Lil Wayne)
2008: T-Pain – "Chopped & Skrewed" (feat. Ludacris)
2008: T-Pain – "Freeze" (feat. Chris Brown)
2009: T-Pain – "Take Your Shirt Off"
2010: T-Pain – "Reverse Cowgirl"
2010: T-Pain - "Rap Song" (feat. Rick Ross)
2011: T-Pain - "Best Love Song" (feat. Chris Brown)
2011: T-Pain - "Booty Wurk (One Cheek At a Time)" (feat. Young Ca$h)
2011: T-Pain - "5 O'Clock" (feat. Wiz Khalifa and Lily Allen)

Tay Dizm
2008: Tay Dizm – "Beam Me Up" (feat. T-Pain & Rick Ross)
2009: Tay Dizm – "Dreamgirl" (feat. Akon)
2009: Tay Dizm – "Nothing But the Truth" (feat. Young Cash & Piccalo)

Young Cash
2009: Young Cash – "I'm a Hustla"

Travie McCoy
2010: Travis McCoy – "Billionaire" (feat. Bruno Mars)

One Chance
2011: One Chance - "Sexin' on You"

Sophia Fresh
2008: Sophia Fresh – "Superbad" (feat. T-Pain & Cee-Lo Green)
2008: Sophia Fresh – "What It Is" (feat. Kanye West)
2009: Sophia Fresh – "It's So Easy" (feat. T-Pain)
2009: Sophia Fresh – "Do the Dance"

Ahmed Belvin
2009: A.B. – "Trophy Girl" (feat. T-Pain)

EPs
2010: T-Pain - Freaknik: The Musical (Soundtrack) - EP

Other media
2010: Freaknik: The Musical
2010: T-Pain: Russian Roulette - Road to Revolver

See also
 List of record labels

References

External links 

American record labels
Contemporary R&B record labels
Hip hop record labels